Xanthodaphne maoria is a species of sea snail, a marine gastropod mollusk in the family Raphitomidae.

Description

Distribution
This marine species is endemic to New Zealand and occurs off the Chatham Islands, New Zealand

References

 Dell, R. K. (1956). The archibenthal Mollusca of New Zealand. Dominion Museum Bulletin. 18: 1–235.
 Spencer, H.G., Marshall, B.A. & Willan, R.C. (2009). Checklist of New Zealand living Mollusca. pp 196–219. in: Gordon, D.P. (ed.) New Zealand inventory of biodiversity. Volume one. Kingdom Animalia: Radiata, Lophotrochozoa, Deuterostomia. Canterbury University Press, Christchurch.

External links
 
 Spencer H.G., Willan R.C., Marshall B.A. & Murray T.J. (2011). Checklist of the Recent Mollusca Recorded from the New Zealand Exclusive Economic Zone

maoria
Gastropods described in 1956
Gastropods of New Zealand